The men's artistic team competition at the 2017 Southeast Asian Games was held on 20 August 2017 at the Hall 10, Level 3, Malaysia International Trade and Exhibition Centre (MITEC) in Kuala Lumpur, Malaysia.

The team competition also served as qualification for the event finals.

Schedule
All times are Malaysia Standard Time (UTC+8).

Results

Qualification results

Floor

Pommel horse

Rings

Vault

Parallel bars

High bar

References

External links
 

Men's artistic team